The San Marino Billie Jean King Cup team represents San Marino in the Billie Jean King Cup tennis competition and are governed by the San Marino Tennis Federation.  They have not competed since 1997.

History
San Marino competed in its first (and thus far, only) Fed Cup in 1997, winning one tie to finish fifth in its Group II pool.

See also
Fed Cup
San Marino Davis Cup team

External links

Billie Jean King Cup teams
Fed Cup
Fed Cup